is a Japanese football player. He currently play for Criacao Shinjuku.

Career
On 2 February 2023, Asanuma announcement officially transfer to JFL club, Criacao Shinjuku for ahead of 2023 season.

Career statistics

Club
Updated to the start of 2023 season.

References

External links
Profile at YSCC Yokohama

1992 births
Living people
Toyo University alumni
Association football people from Hokkaido
Japanese footballers
J2 League players
J3 League players
Japan Football League players
YSCC Yokohama players
SC Sagamihara players
Tochigi SC players
Kamatamare Sanuki players
V-Varen Nagasaki players
Criacao Shinjuku players
Association football goalkeepers